Deearna Missy Goodwin (born 27 January 2003) is an English professional footballer who plays as a forward for Leicester City in the FA Women's Super League. She has been capped internationally for England up to under-19 level.

Early life
Goodwin grew up in Redditch and attended St Augustine's High School.

Club career

Birmingham City
Goodwin came up through the Birmingham City youth system, spending 10 years with the club. Ahead of the 2019–20 season, she spent preseason with the senior team before being registered as part of the first-team squad, gaining first tier gameday experience although she did not debut.

Aston Villa
In July 2020, Goodwin left Birmingham to sign with Aston Villa. Initially playing as part of the club's under-21 academy, Goodwin made her senior debut on 17 November 2021, as a 78th-minute substitute in Villa's 2–1 defeat to Sheffield United in the FA Women's League Cup.

Leicester City
On 7 January 2022, Goodwin signed for Leicester City on a short-term contract for the remainder of the 2021–22 season.

International career

Youth
In October 2019, Goodwin played in all three qualifying round matches during 2020 UEFA Women's Under-17 Championship qualification as England topped the group winning all three games, qualifying the team for the elite round. However, the elite round and subsequent tournament were both cancelled in the wake of the COVID-19 pandemic. In October 2021, Goodwin appeared during 2022 UEFA Women's Under-19 Championship qualification and scored in an 8–1 win over Northern Ireland.

Career statistics

Club
.

References

External links
 

2003 births
Living people
Sportspeople from Redditch
English women's footballers
Women's association football forwards
Aston Villa W.F.C. players
Leicester City W.F.C. players
Women's Super League players
England women's youth international footballers
21st-century English women